Butyricimonas synergistica is a bacterium from the genus of Butyricimonas which has been isolated from rat faeces.

References

Bacteria described in 2009
Bacteroidia